Emil Adolf Rossmässler (Emil Adolf Roßmäßler, Emil Adolph Roßmäßler) (March 3, 1806 in Leipzig – April 8, 1867 in Leipzig) was a German biologist. With Otto Eduard Vincenz Ule and Karl Johann August Müller, he was co-founder of the journal Die Natur in 1852 and 1859 the sole editor of the journal Aus der Heimath. Rossmässler was a pioneer and the leading advocate of popularizing science in nineteenth-century Germany.  He also belonged to the early writers on the building and maintaining of freshwater aquariums.

Publications

 1832: Systematische Übersicht des Tierreiches
 1835–1839: Iconographie der Land- und Süßwassermollusken (3 volumes) - (Iconography of land Mollusca and freshwater Mollusca)
 1835–1837: Iconographie der Land- und Süßwasser-Mollusken, mit vorzüglicher Berücksichtigung der europäischen noch nicht abgebildeten Arten. Volume 1. - pp. Heft 1: [1], I-VI [= 1-6], 1-132, [1-2], Heft 2: [1-2], 1-26, Heft 3: [1-3], 1-3
 1838–1844: Iconographie der Land- und Süßwassermollusken, mit vorzüglicher Berücksichtigung der europäischen noch nicht abgebildeten Arten. Volume 2. - pp. (4+44 pp.), (4+46 pp.), (4+15 pp.), (4+37 pp.), Taf. 31-60. Dresden, Leipzig. (Arnold).
 1854–1859 - Iconographie der Land- und Süsswassermollusken Europa's, mit vorzüglicher Berücksichtigung kritischer und noch nicht abgebildeter Arten. Volume 3. - pp. I-VIII, 1-39, I-VIII, 1-77, [1], I-VIII, 1-140, Taf. 61-90. Leipzig.
 1847: "Helix ligata Müll. Eine kritische Bemerkung". Zeitschrift für Malakozoologie 4: 161–164. Cassel.
1850–53: Der Mensch im Spiegel der Natur
 1853: "Kurzer Bericht über meine malakozoologische Reise durch einen Theil des südöstlichen Spanien". Zeitschrift für Malakozoologie 10 (11): 161-171. Cassel.
1856: Die Geschichte der Erde
 1857: "Diagnoses novorum Heliceorum". Malakozoologische Blätter 4: 38-41. Cassel.
 1858: with Bernhard A. Auerswald, Botanische Unterhaltungen zum Verständniß der heimathlichen Flora. Leipzig, Hermann Mendelssohn.
 1865: Volksbildung
1908: Flora im Winterkleide.

References and external links 
 https://web.archive.org/web/20081011092102/http://www.uni-leipzig.de/campus2009/jubilaeen/2006/rossmaessler.html - in German, with portrait

Further reading
 Andreas Daum, "Science, Politics, and Religion: Humboldtian Thinking and the Transformations of Civil Society in Germany, 1830–1870", in Osiris, no. 17: Science and Civil Society, ed. Tom Broman and Lynn Nyhart. Chicago University Press, 2002, 107–140.
 Andreas Daum, Wissenschaftspopularisierung im 19. Jahrhundert: Bürgerliche Kultur, naturwissenschaftliche Bildung und die deutsche Öffentlichkeit, 1848–1914. ("Popular Science in the Nineteenth Century: Middle-Class Culture, the Sciences, and the Public in Germany") Munich: Oldenbourg, 2002, 617 pp. (including biography and bibliography of works)

1806 births
1867 deaths
Scientists from Leipzig
German religious humanists
19th-century German biologists
German malacologists